Bellis annua subsp. minuta is a subspecies of daisy in the genus Bellis and is a subspecies of Bellis annua. It is endemic to the areas of the eastern and central Mediterranean.

References

annua subsp. minuta
Flora of Italy
Flora of Cyprus
Flora of Crete
Flora of Sardinia
Plants described in 1985